Rheinbach is a town in the Rhein-Sieg-Kreis district (Landkreis), in North Rhine-Westphalia, Germany. It belongs to the administrative district (Regierungsbezirk) of Cologne.

Geography

History

Around 80 AD, the Eifel Aqueduct, one of the longest aqueducts of the Roman Empire, was running through what is today Rheinbach's town centre. The first written documentation of Rheinbach dates back to 762, when Pepin the Short, then King of the Franks, gave lands to the Prüm Abbey. In the early 17th century, Rheinbach came to prominence because of its witch-hunts.

First referred to as a town in 1298, the Archbishop of Cologne purchased Rheinbach and the surrounding villages in 1343. Till 1789, Rheinbach was part of the Electorate of Cologne. In 1794, Rheinbach was incorporated into France within the Département de Rhin-et-Moselle before coming under the auspices of Prussia in 1815.

Around 1947, a considerable number of displaced people from the Sudetenland settled in Rheinbach. Having brought their traditions of glasscraft, Rheinbach became famous for its glass art and today hosts a glass art museum and a specialized school.

Coat of arms
The coat of arms was made official in 1915 by Wilhelm II, German Emperor and King of Prussia. The black cross with the silver background stands for the archdiocese of Cologne. The Eagle stems from the coat of arms from the Counts of Are-Hochstaden. The blue key refers to the Holy Saint Peter, the patron saint of the Archdiocese of Cologne.

Governance

Besides the town proper, Rheinbach administratively comprises the surrounding villages and hamlets, including Flerzheim.

As of 2016, the town council has a Christian Democratic (CDU) majority with 17 seats; the Social Democrats (SPD) hold 10 seats, while the Greens (Die Grünen), the Independents (UWG) and the Liberals (FDP) hold three each.

Education
A local hub for education, Rheinbach is the seat of the Hochschule Bonn-Rhein-Sieg, a university of applied science which specializes in business and biomedical sciences.

There are three secondary schools in Rheinbach. The municipal Gymnasium was founded in 1852 and is one of the oldest public secondary schools in the Bonn region; the Vinzenz-Pallotti-Kolleg was one of the few boarding and private schools in Germany; the Catholic run St.-Joseph-Gymnasium was historically a girls-only school and is now coeducational.

Transport
Rheinbach lies in proximity to the Bundesautobahn 61 which connects it with Cologne. The S-Bahn RB23 connects Rheinbach with Bad Münstereifel and Bonn. Rheinbach is part of the regional bus network of Cologne (Regionalverkehr Köln).

Twin towns – sister cities

Rheinbach is twinned with:
 Deinze, Belgium
 Kamenický Šenov, Czech Republic
 Sevenoaks, England, United Kingdom
 Villeneuve-lès-Avignon, France

Rheinbach and the similarly named town of Rhinebeck, New York, USA, participate in a student exchange program.

Notable people
Hubert Lavies (1833-1905), American farmer, postmaster and legislator
Peter Lavies (c. 1790 – c. 1876), American tavernkeeper, local official, postmaster, moneylender and legislator
Michael Preisinger (born 1962), journalist and writer 
Norbert Röttgen (born 1965), politician, federal minister in 2009–2012
Tim Lobinger (born 1972), pole vaulter
Markus Pröll (born 1979), footballer
Pius Heinz (born 1989), winner of the Main Event of 2011 World Series of Poker

References

External links
Official website 
University of Applied Sciences Bonn-Rhein-Sieg